The Convention of 5 October 1961 Abolishing the Requirement of Legalisation for Foreign Public Documents, also known as the Apostille Convention, is an international treaty drafted by the Hague Conference on Private International Law (HCCH). The Apostille Convention is intended to simplify the procedure through which a document, issued in one of the contracting states, can be certified for legal purposes in the other contracting states of the Convention. A certification under the Convention is called an apostille or Hague apostille (from French apostille, meaning a marginal or bottom note, derived from Latin post illa, meaning "after those [words of the text]"). An apostille is an international certification comparable to a notarisation, and may supplement a local notarisation of the document. If the Convention applies between two states, an apostille issued by the state of origin is sufficient to certify the document, and removes the need for further certification by the destination state.

Background

Many states require the verification of the authenticity of foreign documents in a procedure called legalization, for the document to be legally valid there. This legalization is generally a chain of certifications, by one or more authorities of the state where the document was issued and of the destination state. The first authority certifies the issuer of the document, and each subsequent authority certifies the previous one, until the final certification is made by an authority of the destination state that can be recognized by the final user there. For example, to be accepted in Thailand, a document from the U.S. state of Maryland not issued by a government official must be certified by a notary public, who must then be certified by the clerk of the circuit court in the notary's county, who must then be certified by the state of Maryland, which must then be certified by the U.S. Department of State, which must finally be certified by the Embassy of Thailand in the United States; a Canadian document to be used in the Netherlands must be certified by Global Affairs Canada or the legalization service of a Canadian province or territory, then by an embassy or consulate of the Netherlands in Canada.

In many cases, the legalization procedure is simplified or exempted altogether. For example, if the purpose of a Canadian document is to apply for a Dutch passport in Canada, it is sufficient for the document to be certified by Global Affairs Canada; for a document issued by a Canadian government authority to be used in Brazil, it is sufficient for the document to be certified by a Brazilian embassy or consulate in Canada; member states of the European Union accept documents issued by each other without certification; and states such as Canada, Japan, South Africa, the United Kingdom and the United States generally accept documents from any state without any certification.

The Apostille Convention, drafted by the Hague Conference on Private International Law (HCCH), is intended to simplify the legalization procedure by replacing it with a certification called an apostille, issued by an authority designated by the state of origin. Ideally the apostille would be the only certification needed, but in some cases additional certifications in the state of origin may be required before the apostille is issued. In any case, after the apostille, no certification by the destination state is required.

Contracting states
The Convention permits certain states to sign and ratify the Convention, becoming contracting states. For each of these states, or for an extension to one of its territories, the Convention enters into force 60 days after the deposit of its ratification or territorial extension. Other states are also permitted to become contracting states by acceding to the Convention, but without signing it. For each of these states, during the period of six months after it deposits its accession, the other contracting states may object to it, and the Convention enters into force 60 days after this period, between the acceding state and all other contracting states that did not object to it. Later, if a contracting state withdraws its objection, the Convention enters into force between these two states on that date. A successor state of a previous contracting state may declare to continue to be bound by the Convention without a waiting period or accede later as a new state.

, 124 states are contracting states of the Apostille Convention.

Procedure

Eligible documents
The Convention mentions four types of documents eligible for apostilles:
 court documents;
 administrative documents (e.g. vital records);
 notarial acts;
 official certificates which are placed on documents signed by persons in their private capacity, such as official certificates recording the registration of a document or the fact that it was in existence on a certain date and official and notarial authentications of signatures.
However, the Apostille Convention does not apply to documents issued by diplomatic or consular officers, or to administrative documents dealing directly with commercial or customs operations. The reason for this exclusion is that these documents are usually already exempt from legalization.

Competent authorities
Each contracting state designates one or more authorities to issue apostilles. Examples of designated authorities are government agencies, ministries, courts, local governments, notarial chambers, embassies and consulates. In some states, each authority is designated to issue apostilles only on certain types of documents. For example, in Hungary, apostilles are issued on court documents by the Ministry of Justice, on notarial documents by the Chamber of Civil Law Notaries, and on other documents by the Ministry of Foreign Affairs; in Mexico, apostilles on federal documents are issued by the federal government, and on state documents by the respective state government.

In general, documents issued by a government official can be certified directly with an apostille, while other documents must be certified by a notary, who may then be certified with an apostille. In some cases, additional intermediate certifications may be required; for example, for documents notarized in some U.S. states or issued by New York City, the notary or city official must be certified by the respective county or court, which may then be certified by the respective state with an apostille.

Cost
The fee for issuing an apostille varies widely by state. In 2016, the HCCH compiled fees of 54 states and calculated an average of 15.43 EUR. Some states, such as France and Japan, do not charge a fee, while the Cayman Islands charge 150 KYD (180 USD), one of the highest. In some states, the fee also varies by location, authority, quantity, purpose or type of document. For example, in the United States, Indiana does not charge a fee for an apostille of a birth certificate, while Connecticut charges 40 USD for an apostille not related to adoption.

Format

The apostille is a stamp or printed form, placed on the document itself or attached to the document as an allonge. At the top is the title Apostille, followed by (Convention de La Haye du 5 octobre 1961) (French for "Hague Convention of 5 October 1961"). The Convention specifies that this text must be in French. After this text, the apostille contains ten numbered fields, which may be in English, French or the language of the competent authority, and may be repeated in one or more additional languages. The numbered fields contain the following information:
 Country: [e.g. Hong Kong, China]This public document
 has been signed by [e.g. Henry CHO]
 acting in the capacity of [e.g. Notary Public]
 bears the seal/stamp of [e.g. High Court of Hong Kong]Certified
 at [location or authority issuing the apostille, e.g. High Court]
 the [e.g. 16 April 2014]
 by [e.g. Louis TANG, Registrar, High Court]
 No. [e.g. 2536218517]
 Seal/stamp: [of the authority issuing the apostille, e.g. Emblem of Hong Kong Special Administrative Region]
 Signature: [of the official issuing the apostille]

Verification

Each competent authority must maintain a register of apostilles issued, for verification on request by anyone.

In 2006, the electronic apostille program (also known as e-APP) was launched to support the electronic issuance and verification of apostilles around the world. Since then, many contracting states have implemented electronic apostilles or electronic registers for their verification.

Validity
Apostilles never expire. However, a document certified with an apostille may have an expiration date, or the destination state may require that the document be presented by a certain time.

Additional requirements
The apostille replaces the legalization requirement, but the destination state may have additional requirements for the document to be used there. For example, it may require that the document be translated into a certain language, although it must not require a translation of the apostille itself.

Benefits and disadvantages
The Apostille Convention is beneficial in cases that would otherwise require certifications by both the origin and destination states, as the Convention removes the latter requirement. However, the Convention is neutral in cases that would otherwise require only a certification by the state of origin anyway, similar to an apostille, or no certification at all, and it can be disadvantageous in cases where a consular certification alone would otherwise be sufficient to legalize a document. The Convention requires that contracting states direct their embassies and consulates to no longer perform legalizations of documents where the Convention applies, so in this case the apostille is the only method available to certify the document, not only an alternative to consular legalization, even if the latter would be simpler or less expensive.

For example, before Brazil joined the Apostille Convention, to legalize an educational document from the United States for academic use in Brazil, it was sufficient for the document to be certified by a Brazilian embassy or consulate in the United States, for a fee of 5 USD. After the Convention entered into force in Brazil, its embassy and consulates in the United States can no longer perform legalizations, so U.S. documents must have an apostille to be accepted in Brazil. In some U.S. states, an apostille of an educational document requires more certifications or a higher fee than the Brazilian consular legalization did.

This result is an unintended consequence, as the Convention still allows states to further simplify or eliminate the legalization requirement. The Hague Conference also encourages contracting states to eliminate the need for additional certifications before issuing an apostille, and to ensure that any fees are reasonable.

Limitations and abuse
The apostille only certifies that the signature, signer's capacity, and seal or stamp on the document are from the stated issuer. In other words, it only certifies the origin of the document, but it does not provide information about its content. In 2008, the Hague Conference expressed serious concerns about diplomas and certificates issued by diploma mills, citing their possible use "to circumvent migration controls, possibly by potential terrorists." The risk comes from the fact that the various government stamps give the document an air of authenticity without anyone having checked the underlying document. To address this concern, in 2009 the Hague Conference recommended that authorities add the following statement to apostilles: "This apostille only certifies the signature, the capacity of the signer, and the seal or stamp it bears. It does not certify the content of the document for which it was issued."

Gallery of apostilles by state

See also
Convention on the Issue of Multilingual Extracts from Civil Status Records

Notes

References

External links

Treaty text (HCCH)
Status (HCCH)

1961 in the Netherlands
Hague Conference on Private International Law conventions
Legal documents
Notary
Treaties of Albania
Treaties of Andorra
Treaties of Antigua and Barbuda
Treaties of Argentina
Treaties of Armenia
Treaties of Australia
Treaties of Austria
Treaties of Azerbaijan
Treaties of the Bahamas
Treaties of Bahrain
Treaties of Barbados
Treaties of Belarus
Treaties of Belgium
Treaties of Belize
Treaties of Bolivia
Treaties of Bosnia and Herzegovina
Treaties of Botswana
Treaties of Brazil
Treaties of Brunei
Treaties of Bulgaria
Treaties of Burundi
Treaties of Cape Verde
Treaties of Chile
Treaties of Colombia
Treaties of the Cook Islands
Treaties of Costa Rica
Treaties of Croatia
Treaties of Cyprus
Treaties of the Czech Republic
Treaties of Denmark
Treaties of Dominica
Treaties of the Dominican Republic
Treaties of Ecuador
Treaties of El Salvador
Treaties of Estonia
Treaties of Fiji
Treaties of Finland
Treaties of France
Treaties of Georgia (country)
Treaties of West Germany
Treaties of Greece
Treaties of Grenada
Treaties of Guatemala
Treaties of Guyana
Treaties of Honduras
Treaties extended to British Hong Kong
Treaties of the Hungarian People's Republic
Treaties of Iceland
Treaties of India
Treaties of Ireland
Treaties of Israel
Treaties of Italy
Treaties of Jamaica
Treaties of Japan
Treaties of Kazakhstan
Treaties of Kosovo
Treaties of Kyrgyzstan
Treaties of Latvia
Treaties of Lesotho
Treaties of Liberia
Treaties of Liechtenstein
Treaties of Lithuania
Treaties of Luxembourg
Treaties extended to Portuguese Macau
Treaties of Malawi
Treaties of Malta
Treaties of the Marshall Islands
Treaties of Mauritius
Treaties of Mexico
Treaties of Moldova
Treaties of Monaco
Treaties of Mongolia
Treaties of Montenegro
Treaties of Morocco
Treaties of Namibia
Treaties of the Netherlands
Treaties of New Zealand
Treaties of Nicaragua
Treaties of Niue
Treaties of North Macedonia
Treaties of Norway
Treaties of Oman
Treaties of Palau
Treaties of Panama
Treaties of Paraguay
Treaties of Peru
Treaties of the Philippines
Treaties of Poland
Treaties of the Estado Novo (Portugal)
Treaties of Romania
Treaties of Russia
Treaties of Saint Kitts and Nevis
Treaties of Saint Lucia
Treaties of Saint Vincent and the Grenadines
Treaties of Samoa
Treaties of San Marino
Treaties of São Tomé and Príncipe
Treaties of Saudi Arabia
Treaties of Senegal
Treaties of Serbia and Montenegro
Treaties of Seychelles
Treaties of Singapore
Treaties of Slovakia
Treaties of Slovenia
Treaties of South Africa
Treaties of South Korea
Treaties of Spain
Treaties of Suriname
Treaties of Eswatini
Treaties of Sweden
Treaties of Switzerland
Treaties of Tajikistan
Treaties of Tonga
Treaties of Trinidad and Tobago
Treaties of Tunisia
Treaties of Turkey
Treaties of Ukraine
Treaties of the United Kingdom
Treaties of the United States
Treaties of Uruguay
Treaties of Uzbekistan
Treaties of Vanuatu
Treaties of Venezuela
Treaties of Yugoslavia
Treaties concluded in 1961
Treaties entered into force in 1965
Treaties extended to Ashmore and Cartier Islands
Treaties extended to the Australian Antarctic Territory
Treaties extended to Christmas Island
Treaties extended to the Cocos (Keeling) Islands
Treaties extended to Heard Island and McDonald Islands
Treaties extended to Norfolk Island
Treaties extended to the Netherlands Antilles
Treaties extended to the Coral Sea Islands
Treaties extended to British Antigua and Barbuda
Treaties extended to the Colony of the Bahamas
Treaties extended to the Colony of Barbados
Treaties extended to Basutoland
Treaties extended to the Bechuanaland Protectorate
Treaties extended to British Guiana
Treaties extended to the British Solomon Islands
Treaties extended to Brunei (protectorate)
Treaties extended to British Dominica
Treaties extended to the Colony of Fiji
Treaties extended to the Gilbert and Ellice Islands
Treaties extended to British Grenada
Treaties extended to British Mauritius
Treaties extended to the New Hebrides
Treaties extended to Saint Christopher-Nevis-Anguilla
Treaties extended to British Saint Lucia
Treaties extended to British Saint Vincent and the Grenadines
Treaties extended to the Crown Colony of Seychelles
Treaties extended to Southern Rhodesia
Treaties extended to Swaziland (protectorate)
Treaties extended to the Kingdom of Tonga (1900–1970)
Treaties extended to Aruba
Treaties extended to Surinam (Dutch colony)
Treaties extended to Portuguese Angola
Treaties extended to Portuguese Cape Verde
Treaties extended to Portuguese Timor
Treaties extended to Portuguese Guinea
Treaties extended to Portuguese Mozambique
Treaties extended to Clipperton Island
Treaties extended to French Comoros
Treaties extended to French Somaliland
Treaties extended to French Guiana
Treaties extended to French Polynesia
Treaties extended to the French Southern and Antarctic Lands
Treaties extended to Guadeloupe
Treaties extended to Martinique
Treaties extended to Mayotte
Treaties extended to New Caledonia
Treaties extended to Saint Pierre and Miquelon
Treaties extended to Wallis and Futuna
Treaties extended to Bermuda
Treaties extended to the British Antarctic Territory
Treaties extended to the British Virgin Islands
Treaties extended to the Cayman Islands
Treaties extended to the Falkland Islands
Treaties extended to Gibraltar
Treaties extended to Guernsey
Treaties extended to Jersey
Treaties extended to the Isle of Man
Treaties extended to Montserrat
Treaties extended to Saint Helena, Ascension and Tristan da Cunha
Treaties extended to the Turks and Caicos Islands
Treaties extended to West Berlin